The International Association of Professional Numismatists (IAPN), founded in 1951, is a non-profit organisation of the leading international numismatic firms. The objects of the association are the development of a healthy and prosperous numismatic trade conducted according to the highest standards of business ethics and commercial practice.

The IAPN was constituted at a meeting held in Geneva in 1951 to which the leading international numismatic firms had been invited. There were 28 founding members. The objectives of the association are the development of a healthy and prosperous numismatic trade conducted according to the highest standards of business ethics and commercial practice, the encouragement of scientific research and the propagation of numismatics, and the creation of lasting and friendly relations amongst professional numismatists throughout the world.

Membership is vested in numismatic firms, or in numismatic departments of other commercial institution, and not in individuals. Today there are more than 110 numismatic member firms, situated in five continents and twenty-one countries. the General Assembly is the supreme organ of the association, and this is convened annually, normally in a different country.

The executive committee is composed of twelve to fifteen persons from at least six countries and includes the president, two vice-presidents (one from each hemisphere), the general secretary and the treasurer. There are subcommittees dealing with membership, discipline, publications, anti-forgery work, and government relations.

In pursuit of the objective to encourage numismatic research the association has published or assisted in the publication of a number of important numismatic works. In particular it maintains a close liaison with the International Numismatic Commission, and individual members take an active interest in the work of their national numismatic organizations.

In 1965 the IAPN held an international congress in Paris to consider the study of and defence against counterfeit coins, and in 1975 the association established the International Bureau for the Suppression of Counterfeit Coins (IBSCC). This bureau maintains close links with mints, police-forces, museums and collectors with the publication of specialized reports on counterfeits. Since January 1997 the information about new dangerous counterfeits and the scanned photos of the pieces are available on Internet. The Bulletin of Counterfeits and Internet-access are restricted to members only.

The members of the IAPN guarantee the authenticity of all the coins and medals which they sell – this is a condition of membership. Collectors may purchase numismatic material from any of the firms from the membership list in the full knowledge that if any item did prove to be counterfeit or not as described the piece could be returned and the purchase price would be refunded, without regard to date of purchase.

Membership of the association is not lightly acquired. Applicants have to be sponsored by three members, and the vetting of applications involves a rigorous and sometimes protracted procedure. In order to be admitted the applicants must have been established in business as numismatists for at least four years and must be known to a number of members. The committee need to be satisfied that they have carried on their business in an honourable manners and that they have a good general knowledge of numismatics as well as expertise in whatever field is their speciality.

The Medal of Honour of the association was established in 1963 in memory of its first president, Leonard S. Forrer, and is awarded by the President to persons of distinction whom the association wishes to honour or for distinguished services to the association.

External links